The M106 mortar carrier (full designation: Carrier, Mortar, 107 mm, Self-propelled) was a tracked, self-propelled artillery vehicle in service with the United States Army. It was designed to provide artillery support to mechanized infantry battalions. It was replaced with the M1064 mortar carrier.

History

The M106 is a variation of the M113 armored personnel carrier that carried a 107mm M30 mortar. It was introduced in 1964, alongside the similar M125 81mm mortar carrier, and deployed in Vietnam. Three variants existed: the M106, the M106A1 and the M106A2. 862 M106 (including 841 for US forces), 1,409 M106A1 (including 990 for US forces) and 350 M106A2 (including 53 for the US forces) were produced.

After intensive trials in 1988, the US Army chose to replace it with the 120mm Soltam K6. Some of the M106 carriers were upgraded to the M1064A3 configuration by replacing the 107mm mortar by a 120mm mortar.

Operators
: 25 M106A2
 : 65 M106A1 and 35 M106A2
 
 : 24 M106A1
 
 : 32-36 M106A2
 : 24
 : 18
 : 90 M106A2
 : Captured from Vietnam War

Former operators
 : M106 with a 120mm mortar, known as 12 cm Mw Pz 64 and 12 cm Mw Pz 64/91. 132 bought, retired from service in 2009.
 
 : M106 with a 120mm mortar

See also
 M1064 mortar carrier
 Variants of the M113 armored personnel carrier
 List of U.S. military vehicles by model number

References

External links

Tracked mortars
Military vehicles of the United States
Military vehicles introduced in the 1960s